The Mosfilm Tower is a Russian skyscraper in the Mosfilmovskaya section of Moscow, Russia. This building, located on Mosfilmovskaya street, is a residential complex consisting of 2 towers: one of 213 meters (54 floors) and the other 131 meters (34 floors). The building was completed in December 2011.

Residential buildings completed in 2011
Residential skyscrapers in Moscow